Zhou Mi (born 18 February 1979) is a Chinese badminton player. During much of her career she represented the People's Republic of China, but since 2007 she has represented Hong Kong which has a sports program and teams independent from those of the mainland. In 2010, she received a 2-year ban, for failing a drugs test.

Career 
Since 1998 Zhou has won more than twenty international singles titles on the world circuit and has achieved number one world rankings at various times. She was a silver medalist behind compatriot Gong Ruina at the 2001 IBF World Championships and was a bronze medalist at the 2003 Championships. She won women's singles at the quadrennial Asian Games in 2002, defeating Gong Ruina in the final. Zhou is a three-time finalist at the prestigious All-England Championships where she captured the title in 2003. She played singles for world champion Chinese Uber Cup (women's international) teams in 2002 and 2004.

Olympic controversy 
At the 2004 Athens Olympics Zhou reached the semifinal round where she was eliminated from gold medal contention by fellow countrywoman Zhang Ning. She then defeated Gong Ruina in the playoff for the bronze medal. The circumstances behind Zhou's semifinal defeat are controversial, however, because China's national coach Li Yongbo later confirmed rumors that he had instructed Zhou not to fight hard after she had dropped the first game to Zhang. His rationale was that a fresh Zhang Ning would have a better chance to defeat a non-Chinese opponent, the Netherlands' Mia Audina, in the final.

"Retirement" and comeback 
Whether the Olympic episode or subsequent injury and poor performance was the primary cause, Zhou apparently retired from badminton during the 2005 season. She played no tournaments in 2006 but secured residence in Hong Kong through its Quality Migration program. Zhou then reemerged on the world badminton circuit during the 2007 season. From a weak start at the Singapore Open her results dramatically improved to the point where she had regained a number one world ranking as of the end of the year 2008. Since launching her comeback Zhou's titles have included the New Zealand and Philippines Opens in 2007, and the South Korea, India, Macau Opens, and China Masters in 2008. In December, Zhou ended the 2008 season by winning the BWF Super Series Masters Finals, the biggest prize money event in the sport.

Positive clenbuterol test and two years ban 
The BWF announced on 4 September 2010 that a BWF Doping Hearing conducted in Copenhagen on Monday 23 August has banned Zhou Mi for 2 years from participation in badminton, following an Adverse Analytical Finding. A sample taken from her in late June as part of the BWF's 'out-of-competition' testing programme. Zhou tested positive to clenbuterol, a Class 1 Anabolic Agent on the WADA Prohibited List of substances.

On 27 October 2011, more than one year after she was handed a two-year ban for testing positive for clenbuterol, former badminton world No. 1 Zhou Mi reiterated her innocence. "At the time of the test, I was not competing or preparing to compete. There was not even the slightest reason or incentive for me to take any performance-enhancing substance," said Zhou. Regardless of the incident, Zhou, now 32, added it was time for her to retire from the sport. Clenbuterol can be consumed from eating contaminated food.

Achievements

Olympic Games 
Women's singles

World Championships 
Women's singles

Asian Games 
Women's singles

Asian Championships 
Women's singles

East Asian Games 
Women's singles

World Junior Championships 
Mixed doubles

Asian Junior Championships 
Girls' singles

Girls' doubles

BWF Superseries 
The BWF Superseries, which was launched on 14 December 2006 and implemented in 2007, is a series of elite badminton tournaments, sanctioned by the Badminton World Federation (BWF). BWF Superseries levels are Superseries and Superseries Premier. A season of Superseries consists of twelve tournaments around the world that have been introduced since 2011. Successful players are invited to the Superseries Finals, which are held at the end of each year.

Women's singles

  BWF Superseries Finals tournament
  BWF Superseries tournament

BWF Grand Prix 
The BWF Grand Prix had two levels, the BWF Grand Prix and Grand Prix Gold. It was a series of badminton tournaments sanctioned by the Badminton World Federation (BWF) which was held from 2007 to 2017. The World Badminton Grand Prix sanctioned by International Badminton Federation (IBF) from 1983 to 2006.

Women's singles

Women's doubles

Mixed doubles

  BWF Grand Prix Gold tournament
  BWF & IBF Grand Prix tournament

BWF International Challenge/Series 
Women's singles

  BWF International Challenge tournament
  BWF International Series tournament
  BWF Future Series tournament

Record against selected opponents 
Record against year-end Finals finalists, World Championships semi-finalists, and Olympic quarter-finalists.

References

External links 
 
 

1979 births
Living people
People from Nanning
Badminton players from Guangxi
Chinese female badminton players
Badminton players at the 2004 Summer Olympics
Olympic badminton players of China
Olympic bronze medalists for China
Olympic medalists in badminton
Medalists at the 2004 Summer Olympics
Badminton players at the 2002 Asian Games
Asian Games gold medalists for China
Asian Games medalists in badminton
Medalists at the 2002 Asian Games
Chinese emigrants to Hong Kong
Hong Kong female badminton players
World No. 1 badminton players
Chinese sportspeople in doping cases
Doping cases in badminton